Livingstone aka Bula Matari is a 1925 British silent biographical film produced, directed by and starring M.A. Wetherell in the title role.  It also starred Molly Rogers and Henry Walton. It depicts the life of the African missionary David Livingstone including his efforts to end slavery and bring education in Africa and his celebrated meeting with Henry Morton Stanley.

Cast
 M.A. Wetherell - David Livingstone
 Molly Rogers  - Mary Moffat 
 Henry Walton - Henry Morton Stanley
 Reginald Fox - Gordon Bennett 
 Douglas Cator - Robert Moffatt 
 Simeon Stuart - Neil Livingstone 
 Blanche Graham - Queen Victoria 
 Douglas Peirce - Livingstone, as a child

References

External links

1925 films
1920s historical films
British historical films
British biographical films
Films set in the 19th century
Films directed by M. A. Wetherell
Films set in Africa
Cultural depictions of David Livingstone
Cultural depictions of Henry Morton Stanley
Cultural depictions of Queen Victoria on film
British silent feature films
British black-and-white films
1920s English-language films
1920s British films